Erb's point can refer to:
 Erb's point (neurology)
 Erb's point (cardiology)